Eustorgio Salgar Moreno Salazar (1831–1885) was a Colombian lawyer, general and political figure, who was president of the United States of Colombia from 1870 until 1872. Elected at age 39, he was the youngest president of Colombia.

Biographic data 
Salgar was born in Bogotá, Cundinamarca, on November 1, 1831. He died in the same city, on November 25, 1885.

Early life 
Salgar attended what later became the National University of Colombia, where he studied jurisprudence. In 1851, at the age of 20, he obtained his law degree.

Political career 
From 1853, he was the governor of the Garcia Rovira province and, when it was merged with Pamplona in 1855, he assumed the new role of governor of the newly combined province until 1858. During that year, Salgar was a member of the briefly lived Granadine Confederation's senate and a year later became governor of the Sovereign State of Santander.

Military career 
In 1859, Salgar enlisted in the army of General Tomás Cipriano de Mosquera during the liberal uprising and the war against President Mariano Ospina Rodríguez. Salgar was captured in combat and tried for the insurgency. He was incarcerated until March 31, 1861, when General Mosquera took Bogotá.

Diplomatic career 
Following his term as president, Salgar was appointed as ambassador to the United States of America until 1867.

The presidency 
During the presidential election of 1870, the radical wing of the liberal party nominated Salgar as its candidate. The historical wing of the liberal party nominated General Tomás Cipriano de Mosquera. Salgar obtained the majority of the popular vote and was elected president for the two-years term. He was inaugurated on April 1, 1870.
During his brief presidency, he founded and promoted the country's first railway company and the first corporation intended to provide social security.

References

1831 births
1885 deaths
People from Bogotá
Colombian Liberal Party politicians
Presidents of Colombia
Vice presidents of Colombia
Presidential Designates of Colombia